Nelson Wheatcroft (1852–1897) was an English-born actor and drama teacher. He famously ran a drama school, at the Charles Frohman Empire Theatre, in the late Victorian era, and was a member of The Lambs Club. He was married to Adeline Stanhope (1856–1935). Their son Stanhope Wheatcroft (1888–1966) was a silent film actor.

He was born Christopher William Wheatcroft to William Wheatcroft and Emily Susanna Nelson. He changed his first name to his mother's maiden name. He met Jane Elizabeth Rogers in 1875 and they had five children two of whom died in infancy. While his family lived in London, Wheatcroft toured the country. 

He met Adeline Stanhope, a married woman whose husband was Thomas Amory Sullivan. While the Sullivan went to America, Nelson and Adeline began a relationship. Sullivan returned from America and discovered his wife's adultery with Wheatcroft. After divorcing Sullivan in 1882, Adeline in 1886 married Nelson Wheatcroft, with whom she had a son, Stanhope Wheatcroft. 

At his death in 1897, Nelson Wheatcroft, formerly Christopher Wheatcroft, had not divorced his first wife, Jane, before marrying Adeline, and thus was claimed a bigamist.

References

External links

Portrait gallery (NY Public Library, Billy Rose collection)
Portrait (Univ. of Louisville, Macauley Theatre collection)
Portrait and short bio(Wayback Machine)
portrait of Adeline Stanhope Wheatcroft(Wayback Machine)

1852 births
1897 deaths
Male actors from London
Drama teachers
19th-century English male actors